Trevor Olavae (born April 6, 1959) is a member of the National Parliament of the Solomon Islands. He lives in the area of Vella Lavella.

See also
Politics of Solomon Islands

External links
Member page at Parliament website

1959 births
Living people
Place of birth missing (living people)
Members of the National Parliament of the Solomon Islands
People from the Western Province (Solomon Islands)